Rebecca Campbell may refer to:

Rebecca Campbell (educator) (born 1969), professor of psychology at Michigan State University
Rebecca Campbell (musician) (fl. 1980s–1990s), member of Canadian folk-rock band Fat Man Waving
Rebecca Campbell-Howe (fl. 2000s), solar energy academic